Gaúcho Negro is a 1991 Brazilian romantic adventure film, directed by Jessel Buss.

Plot 
In Rio Grande do Sul, cattle theft and criminal burning torment the farmers until the Gaúcho Negro appears, a masked knight, a mixture of legend and vigilante.

Cast 
Gaúcho da Fronteira
Letícia Spiller .... Adriana
Cláudio Heinrich .... João
Xuxa .... Narrator
Juliana Baroni
Gabriel de Paula.... Gaúcho
Egon Júnior
Isabela Silveira
Jimmy Pipiolo
Pinduca Gomes

See also 
 List of Brazilian films of the 1990s

References

External links 
 

Brazilian adventure films
Brazilian children's films
1991 films
Brazilian romantic comedy films
1990s musical comedy films
1991 comedy films
1990s Portuguese-language films